Louise McSharry (born ca. 1982-1985) is an Irish broadcaster and disc jockey known for her work on RTÉ 2fm.

Background
McSharry was born in Dublin, Ireland. Her father died of cancer at the age of 28, when she was 3 years old. In 1989, she moved to the United States with her mother, Dee, and her younger brother, Andrew. They first lived in Los Angeles, later moving to Chicago. As a result of Dee's alcoholism, McSharry and her brother were placed in the custody of their aunt and uncle, Ger and Ruaidhrí, who also lived in Chicago. McSharry returned to Ireland with her family at the age of 16 while her mother remained in the US. She attended the same secondary school as her future 2fm colleague Eoghan McDermott. They also attended University College Dublin together. McSharry's biological mother Dee died in 2016.

Career
McSharry began her radio career at Newstalk before moving to iRadio in Galway. She joined 2fm in 2010. In 2013, she was asked to stand in for Ryan Tubridy on his flagship 2fm show. In 2016, she published a memoir, Fat Chance: My Life in Ups and Downs and Crisp Sandwiches. She announced her departure from 2fm on 29 October 2021.

Personal life
McSharry was diagnosed with Hodgkin lymphoma in 2014. During treatment, she took a career break until 2015. She married Gordon Spierin in 2015 at Ballinacurra House in Kinsale, County Cork. The couple have two sons: Sam, born in 2016, and Ted, born in 2019.

Bibliography
Fat Chance: My Life in Ups and Downs and Crisp Sandwiches (2016)

References

Irish radio presenters
Irish women radio presenters
Irish DJs
Living people
RTÉ 2fm presenters
Year of birth uncertain
Year of birth missing (living people)